Alessandro Fiordaliso (born 20 March 1999) is an Italian professional footballer who plays as a defender for  club SPAL.

Club career

Torino 
He made his first appearance on the bench for the main squad of Torino on 11 December 2017 in a Serie A game against Lazio.

Loan to Teramo 
On 30 August 2018, Fiordaliso was loaned to Serie C club Teramo on a season-long loan deal. He made his professional debut in Serie C for Teramo on 23 September in a 0–0 home draw against Sambenedettese, he played the entire match. On 27 December he scored his first professional goal in the 62nd minute of a 2–1 away defeat against Ternana. On 9 February 2019, Fiordaliso scored his second goal for the club and the winning goal in the 45th minute of a 1–0 home win over Rimini. On 28 April he scored his third goal in the 28th minute of a 3–2 away defeat against Triestina. Fiordaliso ended his loan to Teramo with 34 appearances, 33 of them as a starter, and 3 goals.

Loan to Venezia 
On 24 July 2019, Fiordaliso was signed by Serie B side Venezia on a season-long loan. Three weeks later, on 11 August, he made his debut for Venezia in a 2–1 home win over Catania in the second round of Coppa Italia, he played the entire match. Two more weeks later, on 24 August he made his Serie B debut for the club in a 2–1 home defeat against Cremonese, he played the entire match. Fiordaliso ended his season-long loan to Venezia with 28 appearances, including 23 of them as a starter, and he remained an unused substitute 9 times, he also made one assist for the club during the season, in December 2019, in the last minute of a 2–2 away draw against Pescara.

Cremonese 
On 25 September 2020, Fiordaliso joined Serie B club Cremonese on a permanent deal.

SPAL 
On 31 August 2022, Fiordaliso signed a three-year contract with SPAL.

Career statistics

Club

Honours

Club 
Torino Primavera

 Coppa Italia Primavera: 2017–18

References

External links
 

1999 births
Footballers from Turin
Living people
Italian footballers
Association football defenders
Torino F.C. players
S.S. Teramo Calcio players
Venezia F.C. players
U.S. Cremonese players
S.P.A.L. players
Serie B players
Serie C players